Now That's What I Call Music! Smash Hits was a compilation album released on 28 September 1987. The album is part of the (UK) Now! series, and is a collaboration with Smash Hits magazine, a successful pop music-based magazine at the time. It was conceived, written and designed by the Smash Hits staff, and the liner notes are written in the magazine's offbeat style.

The album features popular UK Singles Chart hits from 1980 to 1987, in rough backwards chronological order, starting with more recent songs (four songs for each year) and ending with older ones. Many of the older songs had not been featured on any Now albums before as the series did not start until 1983. A companion issue of the magazine was released at the same time, featuring pictures and lyrics to all of the songs on the album.

The front cover of the vinyl and audio cassette releases feature the words 32 Swingorilliant Hits of the 80's. For the compact disc release the number was changed to 31, as Michael Jackson's "One Day in Your Life" is missing from the CD version. A VHS tape was also released featuring 26 music videos of songs from the compilation.

Neil Tennant, who features on side 1 of the album as part of Pet Shop Boys, worked as assistant editor of Smash Hits magazine in the early 1980s.

Smash Hits went on to release their own various artists compilation albums. This is the first album in the UK Now! series with a 1980s theme. Another 3-disc compilation called Now That's What I Call the 80s was released in 2007.

Track listing

CD/record/tape 1 (1987-1984)
 Curiosity Killed the Cat – "Down to Earth"
 Terence Trent D'Arby – "If You Let Me Stay"
 Mel and Kim – "Respectable"
 Hue and Cry – "Labour of Love"
 Five Star – "Rain or Shine"
 Pet Shop Boys – "West End Girls"
 The Housemartins – "Happy Hour"
 Simply Red – "Holding Back the Years"
 a-ha – "Take On Me"
 Dead or Alive – "You Spin Me Round (Like a Record)"
 Eurythmics – "There Must Be an Angel (Playing with My Heart)" (original 7" edit, previously unreleased on CD)
 Tears for Fears – "Everybody Wants to Rule the World"
 Wham! – "Wake Me Up Before You Go Go"
 Bronski Beat – "Smalltown Boy"
 Depeche Mode – "Master and Servant"
 George Michael – "Careless Whisper"

CD/record/tape 2 (1983-1980)
 Spandau Ballet – "True"
 UB40 – "Red Red Wine"
 Thompson Twins – "Hold Me Now"
 The Cure – "The Lovecats"
 Dexys Midnight Runners & The Emerald Express – "Come On Eileen"
 ABC – "The Look of Love"
 Culture Club – "Do You Really Want to Hurt Me"
 Duran Duran – "Save a Prayer"
 Queen & David Bowie – "Under Pressure"
 Michael Jackson – "One Day in Your Life" (not on CD release)
 Haircut One Hundred – "Favourite Shirts (Boy Meets Girl)"
 The Specials – "Ghost Town"
 The Jam – "Going Underground"
 Madness – "Baggy Trousers"
 Adam and the Ants – "Antmusic" (full version with cold ending, previously unreleased)
 Blondie – "Atomic"

References

External links
 Now That's What I Call Music, Smash Hits Track List and album cover

1987 compilation albums
Smash
EMI Records compilation albums
Virgin Records compilation albums
PolyGram compilation albums